PDP Cares Foundation, Inc., otherwise known as PDP (Pilipino Dapat Paglingkuran) CARES, is a non-stock, non-profit organization duly organized under the laws of the Philippines and is registered in the Securities and Exchange Commission on September 27, 2018 and has established chapters in the National Capital Region.

Positions
All the officers and members of the organization adhere to the following principles:

1. Promote, advance, and protect the well-being of Filipinos, in general.

2. Develop, enhance, and improve access to facilities and services especially among poor people in both urban and rural barangays.

3. Protect our natural resources.

Electoral history

2022 elections
After gaining accreditation from the Commission on Elections, PDP Cares made their first attempt to seek a party-list representation in the Philippine House of Representatives with Kathryna Yu-Pimentel, wife of incumbent senator Aquilino "Koko" Pimentel, as their first nominee. They did not win a seat.

References

External links
 PDP Cares Official website
 PDP Cares Facebook page
 PDP Cares Instagram account

Organizations based in the Philippines
Organizations based in Metro Manila
Organizations established in 2017
Humanitarian aid organizations
2017 establishments in the Philippines